Vladimir Kopteff (Viipuri, 1932 – Helsinki, 2007) well known as a sculptor.

Vladimir Kopteff became famous as an artist.

Vladimir Kopteff art presentations
1969 – Strindberg Gallery Helsinki
1970 – TM Gallery Helsinki
1971 – The Gallery of the Artist's Association of Helsinki
1972 – Gallery Artek Helsinki
1974 – International Steel Sculpture Workshop and Symposium
1975 – Kluuvin galleria Helsinki, Museum Eger, Hungary
1977 – Gallery Vecu Antwerp, Belgium
1978 – Gallery Margaretha de Boeve, Assenede Belgium
1980 – Taidegraafikot Galleria Helsinki
1981 – KOP Olunkylä Helsinki
1982 – Artlisa Galleria Pori
1983 – Ässä Galleria Helsinki
1985 – Galleria Tavastia Hämeenlinna
1986 – Kluuvin Galleria Helsinki
1987 – International Steel Sculpture Workshop and Symposium, Dunaújváros, Unkari
1989 – The Nationale School of Fine Arts, Brussel, Belgium
1993 – International Steel Sculpture Workshop and Symposium

External links
Vladimir Kopteff

20th-century American sculptors
20th-century American male artists
American male sculptors
1932 births
2007 deaths